Haunani Minn Singer (September 30, 1947 - November 23, 2014) was an American film and television actress. She was married to actor Marc Singer. Among her TV credits are "Hawaii Five-0" ("Murder with A golden Touch") and MASH ("Guerilla, My dreams")

Filmography

Television

References

External links
 

American film actresses
American television actresses
American voice actresses
1947 births
2014 deaths
Actresses from Honolulu
20th-century American actresses
21st-century American actresses